Treason (translit. Prodosia) is a 1964 Greek drama film directed by Kostas Manoussakis. It was entered into the 1965 Cannes Film Festival. The film was also selected as the Greek entry for the Best Foreign Language Film at the 37th Academy Awards, but was not accepted as a nominee.

Cast
 Petros Fyssoun - Lieutenant Carl von Stein
 Manos Katrakis - Professor Viktor Kastriotis
 Dimitris Myrat - Dr. Heinrich Stockmann
 Elli Fotiou - Liza
 Zorz Sarri - Mrs. Kastrioti
 Dimitris Nikolaidis - captain Zakas
 Dora Volanaki
 Giorgos Bartis
 Ioanna Carrer
 G. Daskalopoulos
 Vangelis Kazan - (as Evangelos Kazan) - police captain
 Spiros Maloussis
 Hristoforos Niakas
 Giorgos Oikonomou - soldier

See also
 List of submissions to the 37th Academy Awards for Best Foreign Language Film
 List of Greek submissions for the Academy Award for Best Foreign Language Film

References

External links

1964 films
1960s Greek-language films
1964 drama films
Greek black-and-white films
Films set in Greece
Films directed by Kostas Manoussakis
Greek drama films